The 1951 National League Division Three was the fifth and final season of British speedway's National League Division Three

The league remained with 10 teams but there were changes. Oxford Cheetahs, Leicester Hunters and Liverpool Chads had all moved up to Division Two whilst Tamworth Tammies dropped out. 

Plymouth Devils dropped down from Division Two. The three new sides were Cardiff Dragons, Long Eaton Archers and Wolverhampton Wasps. 

Poole Pirates won their first title. Alan Smith of Plymouth topped the averages.

Final table

Leading Averages

National Trophy Stage Three
 For Stage Two - see Stage Two
 For Stage Three - see Stage Three

The 1951 National Trophy (sponsored by the Daily Mail) was the 14th edition of the Knockout Cup. The Trophy consisted of three stages; stage one was for the third division clubs, stage two was for the second division clubs and stage three was for the top tier clubs. The winner of stage one would qualify for stage two and the winner of stage two would qualify for the third and final stage. Exeter won stage one and therefore qualified for stage two.

Third Division Qualifying First round

Third Division Qualifying semifinals

Qualifying final
First leg

Second leg

See also
List of United Kingdom Speedway League Champions
Knockout Cup (speedway)

References

Speedway National League Division Three
1951 in British motorsport
1951 in speedway